Larry Miller (born 21 July 1956) is a Canadian politician who served as the Member of Parliament (MP) for the riding of Bruce—Grey—Owen Sound from 2004 to 2019 as a member of the Conservative Party.

Early life and career 
Miller was born in Wiarton, Ontario on 21 July 1956. Before entering federal politics, Miller was a councillor in Keppel Township, Ontario from 1991 to 1993. He progressed to Deputy Reeve in 1994, and in 1996 became the Reeve of Keppel Township. He was briefly a councillor in Grey County between 2000 and 2001, and between 2000 and 2004 he was mayor of Georgian Bluffs.  He also owns a beef-farming operation.

Federal politics 
Miller won the Conservative Party nomination for Bruce—Grey—Owen Sound in 2004, and defeated three-term Liberal MP Ovid Jackson by almost 5,000 votes in that year's federal election.

With many historic Georgian Bay lighthouses in his riding, Miller sponsored the bill that became the Heritage Lighthouse Protection Act in the Commons in January 2008.

In the 2015 election, Miller was reelected by almost 5,000 votes.

Miller did not seek re-election in the 2019 federal election and retired from politics.

Bill C-19 controversy

On 7 February 2012, during a Parliamentary Debate about Bill C-19, Miller stirred controversy after comparing the long-gun registry to Adolf Hitler and the Nazi Regime quoting former Liberal Minister Allan Rock: "I came to Ottawa last year with the firm belief that the only people in Canada who should have firearms are police officers and the military." Miller added afterwards: "Sound familiar? Adolf Hitler. 1939". Later on, he quoted former Liberal Senator Sharon Carstairs who'd said "the registering of hunting rifles is the first step in the social re-engineering of Canadians" which Miller added "that is what Adolf Hitler tried to do in the 1930s". Miller later retracted his statements.

Citizenship ceremony controversy

On 16 March 2015, while appearing on a call-in show on CFOS Radio, Miller commented on the issue of Zunera Ishaq wishing to wear a niqab at her citizenship ceremony. Miller said, "if you don't like that or don't want to do that, stay the hell where you came from, is the way, and I think most Canadians feel the same... I'm so sick and tired of, of people wanting to come here because they know it's a good country and then they want to change things before they even really officially become a Canadian, so , I have no sympathy for her..." The following day, Miller issued a statement apologizing for  part of his comments, but maintained his opinion that one should uncover their face when taking the citizenship oath.

Personal life

Miller is married with three children and three grandchildren.

Electoral record

Note: Conservative vote is compared to the total of the Canadian Alliance vote and Progressive Conservative vote in 2000 election.

References

External links

 
 Personal Website

Conservative Party of Canada MPs
Members of the House of Commons of Canada from Ontario
Mayors of places in Ontario
1956 births
Living people
21st-century Canadian politicians